Carl-Adam Nolcken Stjernswärd (20 July 1905 – 18 March 1981) was a Swedish Army officer and horse rider. He competed in eventing at the 1936 Summer Olympics and placed 11th individually.

Stjernswärd became major in the reserve in 1948.

Awards and decorations
  Knight of the Order of the Sword (1950)

References

1905 births
1973 deaths
Swedish Army officers
Olympic equestrians of Sweden
Swedish male equestrians
Equestrians at the 1936 Summer Olympics
Knights of the Order of the Sword
People from Kristianstad Municipality
Sportspeople from Skåne County